The IQA European Games (EG) are the biennial games for the sport of quidditch held in Europe where national governing bodies send national teams to compete. The European Games were created in response to the IQA World Cup, the biennial tournament wherein nations from around the world compete in a similar style to the FIFA World Cup. Both Games alternate years so in the off years regional tournaments such as the European Games or the Asian Quidditch Cup can occur. These games are the highest level of championships in quidditch aside from Global Games. The 2015 champions were Team France, narrowly beating Team UK.

History

The 2015 European Games were the inaugural championships of this tournament. Bid on by European cities, the organizational body Quidditch Europe decided on Sarteano, Italy to host the games. Sarteano proceeded to host an aggressive advertising campaign across the country as well as locally which included the sale of specially made artisanal crafts, wine and cheese. The 2019 edition was held in Bamberg, Germany.

Format
The twelve teams competing in the 2015 games were separated into two groups of six teams. The group stage began on 25 July 2015 and ended the morning of the 26th. The groups themselves were split into pots based on EQC rankings and seasonal performance matched up. The top four teams from each group qualified for the bracket stage, where brackets were determined using the following criteria: games won, head-to-head, QPD and SWIM catches. Finally, the tournament ended with semi-finals, a third place final and the gold medal match.

Notes

Results

Medals summary

Appearance

Legend
 – Champions
 – Runners-up
 – Third place
 – Fourth place
 – Did not enter / Did not qualify
 – Hosts
Q – Qualified for forthcoming tournament

Notes

See also

 International Quidditch Association
 IQA World Cup
 Muggle quidditch
 European Quidditch Cup

References

External links
IQA website

Quidditch competitions
Recurring sporting events established in 2015
2015 establishments in Europe